Sweden–Tunisia relations refers to the current and historical relationship between Sweden and Tunisia. Connections between the two countries date back to 1736, when the Swedes concluded a treaty of peace and trade with the Beylik of Tunis. Formal relations began after Tunisian independence from France in 1956, and have continued since. Sweden formerly had an embassy in Tunis, now closed. Instead the Swedish ambassador resides in Stockholm, where Tunisia also maintains an embassy. Lazhar Bououni is a former Tunisian ambassador to Sweden.

In 2016 and after 14 years of its closure, the Swedish embassy in Tunis has reopened its doors in the presence of the foreign ministers of the two countries. Tunisia has an embassy in Stockholm, and after the tunisian president Beji Caid Essebsi official visit in November 2015, the head of the embassy became ambassador. 

Tunisia is a popular destination for Swedish tourists, in addition to the bilateral trade and humanitarian aid between the countries. During the unrest which followed the Tunisian Revolution in January 2011, about a dozen Swedes who had come to Tunisia to hunt boars were beaten and arrested on suspicion of being foreign terrorists. While the Sweden supported the new leadership of Tunisia following the Revolution, the Left Party politician Hans Linde condemned the Swedish government for maintaining an extensive arms trade with Tunisia in previous years, fueling the regime of Zine El Abidine Ben Ali.

See also

 Foreign relations of Sweden
 Foreign relations of Tunisia
 Tunisia–EU relations

References

 
Tunisia
Sweden